Mac Pro Football is a 1986 video game published by The Avalon Hill Game Company.

Gameplay
Mac Pro Football is a game in which three levels of coaching skill are available, and the computer opponent remembers previous plays and can change the game plan in the second half of the game.

Reception
Wyatt Lee reviewed the game for Computer Gaming World, and stated that "Minus yardage must be tabulated for the only thing missing, sound effects. The plus yardage described is due to get better as additional Team Data
Disks are released."

References

External links
Review in MacUser
Review in MacWorld
Review in Washington Apple Pi

1986 video games
American football video games
Avalon Hill video games
Classic Mac OS games
Classic Mac OS-only games
Sports management video games
Video games developed in the United States
Video games set in the United States